Founded in 1889, the Association for the Preservation of Virginia Antiquities was the United States' first statewide historic preservation group. In 2003 the organization adopted the new name APVA Preservation Virginia to reflect a broader focus on statewide Preservation and in 2009 it shortened its name to Preservation Virginia.  Preservation Virginia owns historic sites across Virginia including Historic Jamestowne, located at Jamestown, Virginia, site of the first permanent English settlement in North America, and the Cape Henry Light house, one of the first public works projects of the United States of America.

Organization
Preservation Virginia has helped preserve several key historic properties and items. Its 1889 rescue of the Powder Magazine in Williamsburg, Virginia, came decades before Colonial Williamsburg's creation. Its mission is similar to organizations such as the National Trust for Historic Preservation in the U.S. and The National Trust in Britain, however Preservation Virginia also seeks to cultivate an awareness of the importance of Virginia's heritage as an "economic asset".

The organization's branches represent Preservation Virginia across the state; in Richmond, Preservation Virginia's self-governing affiliate is Historic Richmond Foundation, which merged in July 2005 with Preservation Virginia's William Byrd Branch.

Preservation Virginia also operates the statewide revolving fund, which protects historic properties with easements before placing them on the market, and organizes an annual Preservation Conference. Starting in 1994, a major archaeological campaign conducted by Preservation Virginia at Jamestown known as Jamestown Rediscovery has discovered the remains of the original 1607 settlement, and greatly increased the knowledge of Jamestown.

Revolving Fund Program
Preservation Virginia has operated a revolving fund program since 1989. The program is dedicated to saving historic property in Virginia that is at risk of destruction from either demolition or severe neglect.

Historic sites
Preservation Virginia museum sites include:
Bacon's Castle, Virginia's oldest brick residence, in Surry
Cape Henry Lighthouse, the first federal public works project under President George Washington, in Virginia Beach
Historic Jamestowne, the site of the London Company settlement of May 1607
John Marshall House, the home of Chief Justice of the Supreme Court John Marshall in Richmond
Patrick Henry's Scotchtown, the Hanover County home of Patrick Henry, revolutionary and first Virginia Governor
Smith's Fort Plantation in Surry
 Cole Digges House in Richmond – open by appointment, serves as the headquarters for Preservation Virginia
 Debtors' Prison in Accomac, Virginia – open by appointment

Preservation Virginia also manages Warner Hall Graveyard in Gloucester and the Cub Creek Church site in Charlotte County.

Legacy properties
Preservation Virginia owned and restored many historic properties that are now owned and operated as museums by other organizations. Some of the properties are open on a limited basis or by appointment.

 Farmers' Bank in Petersburg
 Northampton County Court Green in Eastville, Virginia
 Old Isle of Wight Courthouse in Smithfield
 Old Stone House, part of and operated by the Edgar Allan Poe Museum in Richmond
 Pear Valley in Northampton County
 Smithfield Plantation in Blacksburg
 Thomas Read's Clerk's Office, part of the Museum of Charlotte County
 Walter Reed Birthplace in Belroi, Virginia

Preservation Virginia formerly operated several sites in Fredericksburg, which are now operated by Washington Heritage Museums.
Hugh Mercer Apothecary 
Mary Washington House 
Rising Sun Tavern
St. James' House

References

External links
 Preservation Virginia official web site
 Open Library. Items related to the Association for the Preservation of Virginia Antiquities.

State history organizations of the United States
History of Virginia
Museums in Virginia
Non-profit organizations based in Richmond, Virginia
Museum organizations
Historic preservation organizations in the United States
1889 establishments in Virginia
Organizations established in 1889
Historical societies in Virginia